Zatrephes cardytera is a moth of the family Erebidae. It was described by Harrison Gray Dyar Jr. in 1910. It is found in French Guiana, Guyana and Venezuela.

References

Phaegopterina
Moths described in 1910